Amanda Leon (born March 3, 1992) is an American professional wrestler, model, actress, and dancer.

Early life 
Leon was born in Brooklyn, New York but grew up in both Lancaster and Harrisburg, Pennsylvania. She is of Puerto Rican, Cuban, Italian, and French descent.

Professional wrestling career

Ring of Honor (2014–2022) 
Leon made her professional wrestling debut on April 18, 2014, in a losing effort to Jenny Rose. At ROH Future Of Honor #1 in Newville, Pennsylvania. Three months later Leon lost in a tag team match to Jenny Rose and Veda Scott at ROH Future Of Honor #2 event.

On July 25, 2015, Leon won her first match for Ring of Honor defeating Deonna Purrazzo in a dark match. During the ROH Reloaded Tour Leon lost to Taeler Hendrix. Later that year Leon and Sumie Sakai defeated Purrazzo and Hania "The Howling Huntress" getting her second victory in a dark match.

On February 6, 2016, Leon wrestled her first TV match for Ring Of Honor. In a losing effort to Hania the Howling Huntress at ROH on SBG #249 - Women of Honor Special. Leon defeated her in a rematch on July 8, 2016 in a 2 Out of 3 Falls match.

After ending her program with Hania, Leon entered a rivalry with Taeler Hendrix. The two wrestled in a dark match from the July 30 episode of ROH Television. Leon picked up the victory, but was attacked by Hendrix after the match. The two then brawled backstage. Weeks later, Leon came to the aid of Deonna Purrazzo, who was being attacked by Hendrix. This led to a tag match between the three, as well as a mystery partner for Taeler, in Lockport, New York, which saw Leon pinned by Hendrix’s partner, Jessicka Havok, after Hendrix drilled her with a steel chair. These events all led to Leon and Hendrix squaring off in the first ever No Disqualification match in Women of Honor history at ROH on SBG #276, with Hendrix coming out on top after hitting her Kiss Goodnight finisher onto a pile of chairs, after Leon decided to not hit Hendrix with one herself. Because of this loss, Leon found herself attempting to go to "a darker place", becoming noticeably more aggressive in her matches. Unfortunately, the feud was cut short when Hendrix was granted her release from Ring of Honor. To write her off, Leon handed ROH commentator Ian Riccaboni a tarot card of death, and said the WOH Division had been cleansed of dishonor. Leon would also wrestle her match that night with blood splattered on her body.

Leon defeated Jessicka Havok in a match that aired on December 14, 2016.

In March 2017, Leon was defeated by Sumie Sakai in a three-way match that also included Jenny Rose, while also displaying a heel persona and resorting to villainous tactics during the match. At the November 12 TV tapings, Leon defeated Stella Gray in singles action.

Leon was later announced as one of the participants in the Women of Honor Championship Tournament in 2018. She defeated Madison Rayne in the first round, but was defeated by Kelly Klein in the quarterfinals.

At the G1 Supercard, Leon aligned herself with the debuting Angelina Love & Velvet Sky to form a stable known as "The Allure". The trio attacked Kelly Klein who just had won the championship against Mayu Iwatani, as well as Jenny Rose and Stella Gray who tried to save Klein, turning heel in the process.

WWE (2014–2015) 
Leon made numerous appearances on WWE television in 2014 and 2015 as a "Rosebud" for Adam Rose.

In January 2015, it was reported that Leon took part in a WWE tryout camp at the WWE Performance Center in Orlando.

World Wonder Ring Stardom (2017) 
On August 19, 2017, Leon made her debut for Japanese promotion World Wonder Ring Stardom, entering the 2017 5★Star GP and defeating former World of Stardom Champion Io Shirai in her opening match. Her next outing was a loss to Jungle Kyona. However, Leon rebounded from this, going on to defeat names like Toni Storm and HZK before losing to Kay Lee Ray. Leon’s last two matches in the tournament saw her defeat Tam Nakano and suffer an upset loss to Konami.

Major League Wrestling (2023–present) 
On March 4, 2023 it was announced that former Mandy Leon will be set to debut at Major League  Wrestling (MLW) pay-per-view by the name of War Chamber of 2023 in New York City.

Championships and accomplishments
 Keystone Pro Wrestling
 KPW Vixen Championship (2 times)
 The Ultimate Wrestling Experience
 UWE Women's Championship (1 time)
 Vicious Outcast Wrestling
 VOW Vixen's Championship (1 time)

References

External links

1992 births
Living people
American female professional wrestlers
American professional wrestlers of Italian descent
American people of Cuban descent
American people of French descent
American people of Puerto Rican descent
Sportspeople from Brooklyn
Sportspeople from Lancaster, Pennsylvania
Professional wrestlers from New York (state)
21st-century professional wrestlers
Professional wrestlers from New York City